The 2013 New South Wales Swifts season saw New South Wales Swifts compete in the 2013 ANZ Championship. During the regular season they finished eighth with a 4–9 record and did not qualify for the play-offs. During the season they defeated West Coast Fever, Northern Mystics, Canterbury Tactix and Melbourne Vixens.

Players

2013 roster

Milestones
  Melissa Tallent made her ANZ Championship debut in Round 5 against West Coast Fever.
  Vanessa Ware played her 100th game for Sydney Swifts/New South Wales Swifts against Southern Steel in Round 7. After 107 games and 11 seasons, Ware retired from elite netball after the Round 14 game against Canterbury Tactix. 
 Susan Pettitt played her 150th elite netball game in Round 13 against Queensland Firebirds.

Melbourne Vixens Summer Challenge
The main pre-season event was the Summer Challenge, hosted by Melbourne Vixens at the State Netball Hockey Centre on 23 and 24 February.

Regular season

Fixtures and results
Round 1

Round 2

Round 3

Round 4

Round 5

Round 6
 received a bye.
Round 7

Round 8

Round 9

Round 10

Round 11

Round 12

Round 13

Round 14

Final table

Statistics
 As of Sunday 17 November 2013

Award winners

References

New South Wales Swifts seasons
New South Wales Swifts